Blyth Festival, located in Blyth, Ontario, Canada, specializes in the production and promotion of Canadian plays. The following is a chronological list of the productions that have been staged as part of the Festival since its inception. World Premieres have also been noted.

1975
The Mousetrap - by Agatha Christie
Mostly in Clover (World Premiere)- by Harry J. Boyle

1976
The Blood Is Strong (World Premiere)- by Lister Sinclair
How I Met My Husband (World Premiere)- by Alice Munro
Mostly in Clover - by Harry J. Boyle
Shape(World Premiere) - by Jim Schaefer

1977
A Summer Burning(World Premiere) - by Anne Chislett from the novel by Harry J. Boyle
The Blood Is Strong - by Lister Sinclair
The Blyth Memorial History Show (World Premiere)- by Jim Schaefer
The Shortest Distance Between Two Points (World Premiere) - by Keith Roulston

1978
The Huron Tiger(World Premiere) - by Peter Colley
His Own Boss (World Premiere) - by Keith Roulston
The School Show(World Premiere) - by Ted Johns
Gwendoline (World Premiere)- by James W. Nichol
Two Miles Off - by the Theatre Network

1979
This Foreign Land (World Premiere) - by Patricia Mahoney
I'll Be Back For You Before Midnight (World Premiere)- by Peter Colley
McGillicuddy's Lost Weekend (World Premiere)- by Keith Roulston
Child (World Premiere)- by James W. Nichol
The Death of the Donnellys - by Theatre Passe Muraille and Ted Johns

1980
John and the Missus - by Gordon Pinsent
St. Sam of the Nuke Pile(World Premiere) - by Ted Johns
i'll be back for you before midnight - by Peter Colley
The Life That Jack Built (World Premiere)- by David Fox and Janet Amos

1981
He Won't Come In From The Barn - by Ted Johns
Quiet In The Land(World Premiere) - by Anne Chislett
Love or Money (World Premiere) - by Carol Bolt
The Tomorrow Box - by Anne Chislett
Fire On Ice (World Premiere)- by Keith Roulston

1982
Down North(World Premiere) - by Janet Amos
Heads You Lose(World Premiere) - by Peter Colley
La Sagouine - by Antonine Maillet
Country Hearts(World Premiere) - by Ted Johns and John Roby
Quiet In The Land - by Anne Chislett

1983
Nobody's Child (World Premiere)- by Janice Wiseman and Holden Jones
My Wild Irish Rose (World Premiere)- by Janet Amos
Tighten The Traces, Haul In The Reins - by Robbie O'Neill
Naked On The North Shore - by Ted Johns
The Innocent And The Just - by Gratien Gélinas
The Tomorrow Box - by Anne Chislett

1984
Garrison's Garage(World Premiere) - by Ted Johns
A Spider In The House(World Premiere) - by Brian Tremlay
Cake-Walk(World Premiere) - by Colleen Curran
Blue City Slammers (World Premiere) - by Layne Coleman
Country Hearts - by Ted Johns and John Roby

1985
Polderland(World Premiere) - by Brian Wade
Moose County (World Premiere)- by Colleen Curran
Beaux Gestes and Beautiful Deeds - by Marie-Lynn Hammond
Primrose School District 109 (World Premiere)- by Ted Galay
Garrison's Garage - by Ted Johns

1986
Another Season's Promise (World Premiere) - by Anne Chislett and Keith Roulston
Drift - by Rex Deverell
Gone To Glory  (World Premiere)- by Suzanne Finlay
Lilly, Alta.  (World Premiere)- by Kenneth Dybat
Cake-Walk - by Colleen Curran

1987
Girls In The Gang (World Premiere) - by John Roby and Raymond Storey
Miss Balmoral of the Bayview  (World Premiere)- by Colleen Curran
Bush Fire (World Premiere) - by Laurie Fyffe
Another Season's Promise  - by Anne Chislett and Keith Roulston
Bordertown Café (World Premiere) - by Kelly Rebar

1988
The Cookie War  (World Premiere)- by Kathleen McDonnell
The Mail Order Bride - by Robert Clinton
Lucien - by Marshall Button
Fires In The Night  (World Premiere)- by David S. Craig
Bordertown Café  - by Kelly Rebar

1989
Perils of Persephone  (World Premiere)- by Dan Needles
Sticks and Stones (part 1) by James Reaney
The Right One (World Premiere) - by Bryan Wade
The Dreamland (World Premiere) - by Raymond Storey and John Roby
The Mail Order Bride - by Robert Clinton

1990
Local Talent (World Premiere) - by Collen Curran
Albertine in Five Times - by Michel Tremblay
A Field of Flowers (World Premiere) - by Laurie Fyffe
The Perils of Persephone - by Dan Needles
Firefly (World Premiere) - by Carol Sinclair with music by John Alcorn

1991
Two Brothers (World Premiere) - by Ted Johns
Barbershop Quartet (World Premiere) - by Layne Coleman
The Stone Angel - by James W. Nichol based on the novel by Margaret Laurence
End Of The World Romance  (World Premiere)- by Sean Dixon
Cornflower Blue (World Premiere) - by Kelly Rebar

1992
The Puff 'n' Blow Boys - by Valoreyne Brandt Jenkins
The Hometown Boy  (World Premiere)- by Robert Clinton
Back Up and Push - or The Confessions of a Reformed Cynic (World Premiere) - by Ted Johns
The Glorious 12th  (World Premiere)- by Raymond Storey
Yankee Notions  (World Premiere)- by Anne Chislett
I'll Be Back Before Midnight - by Peter Colley

1993
Many Hands (World Premiere) - by Dale Hamilton
Ceili House  (World Premiere)- by Colleen Curran
Safe Haven  (World Premiere)- by Mary-Colin Chisholm
The Old Man's Band (World Premiere) - by John Roby
Web  (World Premiere)- by Rosalind Goldsmith
The Glorious 12th - by Raymond Storey

1994
Glengarry School Days (World Premiere) - by Anne Chislett
He Won't Come In From The Barn - by Ted Johns
The Black Bonspiel of Wullie MacCrimmon - by W.O. Mitchell
Bouncing Back  (World Premiere)- by Suzanne Finlay

1995
Ballad for a Rum Runner's Daughter  (World Premiere)- book & lyrics by Laurie Fyffe and music by Beth Barley
This Year, Next Year  (World Premiere)- by Norah Harding
The Tomorrow Box - by Anne Chislett
Jake's Place (World Premiere) - by Ted Johns
He Won't Come In From The Barn - by Ted Johns

1996
Barndance, Live!  (World Premiere)- by Paul Thompson
Ma Belle Mabel - by Cindy Cowan
Villa Eden (World Premiere) - by Colleen Curran
Fireworks  (World Premiere)- by Gordon Portman

1997
Quiet in the Land - by Anne Chislett
Booze Days in a Dry County  (World Premiere)directed by Paul Thompson
There's Nothing In The Paper (World Premiere) - by David Scott
The Melville Boys - by Norm Foster
Barndance, Live! - by Paul Thompson
Overboard! (World Premiere) - by Deborah Kimmett

1998
Yesteryear - by Joanna McClelland Glass
Wilbur County Blues (World Premiere)- by Andrew Moodie
Thirteen Hands - by Carol Shields
Jobs, Jobs, Jobs (World Premiere) - by Keith Roulston
Hot Flashes (World Premiere) - by Paul Ledoux and John Roby

1999
That Summer (World Premiere) - by David French
Big Box (World Premiere) - by David Carley
The Great School Crisis of '99 (World Premiere) - by Ted Johns
Every Dream (World Premiere) - by James W. Nichol
When the Reaper Calls - by Peter Colley

2000
Death of the Hired Man (World Premiere)- by Paul Thompson
Anne adapted for the stage by Paul Ledoux
Corker - by Wendy Lill
The Drawer Boy - by Michael Healey
Stolen Lives - the Albert Walker Story (World Premiere) - by Peter Colley
When the Reaper Calls - by Peter Colley

2001
The Outdoor Donnellys  (World Premiere) - by Paul Thompson and Janet Amos
The Passion of Narcisse Mondoux - by Gratien Gelinas
Cruel Tears - by Ken Mitchell and Humphrey & the Dumptrucks
McGillicuddy (World Premiere)  - by Keith Roulston
Sometime, Never (World Premiere)  - by Norah Harding
Corner Green  (World Premiere) - by Gordon Pinsent

2002
The Outdoor Donnellys - by Paul Thompson and Janet Amos
Goodbye, Piccadilly  (World Premiere) - by Douglas Bowie
Filthy Rich - by George F. Walker
The Drawer Boy - by Michael Healey
Barnboozled: He Won't Come In From the Barn, part II (World Premiere)  - by Ted Johns

2003
The Perilous Pirate's Daughter (World Premiere)  - by Anne Chislett & David Archibald
Leaving Home - by David French
Hippie (World Premiere)  - by Jonathan Garfinkel, Kelly McIntosh and Paul Thompson
Having Hope at Home (World Premiere)  - by David S. Craig
Barnboozled: He Won't Come In From the Barn, part II  - by Ted Johns

2004
The Outdoor Donnellys - by Paul Thompson and Janet Amos
Heat Wave - by Michel Marc Bouchard
Salt-Water Moon - by David French
Spirit of the Narrows (World Premiere)  - by Anne Lederman
Cricket & Claudette (World Premiere)  - by Ted Johns
Test Drive (World Premiere)  - by Dave Carley

2005
The Ginkgo Tree - by Lee MacDougall
Powers and Gloria (World Premiere) - by Keith Roulston
The Thirteenth One (World Premiere)  - by Denyse Gervais Regan
I'll be back before midnight - by Peter Colley
Spirit of the Narrows - by Anne Lederman

2006
Ballad of Stompin' Tom  (World Premiere) - by David Scott, songs by Stompin' Tom Connors
Lost Heir (World Premiere)  - by Sean Dixon
Another Season's Harvest (World Premiere) - by Anne Chislett & Keith Roulston
Schoolhouse (World Premiere) - by Leanna Brodie

2007
The Eyes of Heaven (World Premiere)  - by Beverley Cooper
Queen Milli of Galt - by Gary Kirkham
World Without Shadows - by Lance Woolaver
Reverend Jonah  (World Premiere) - by Paul Ciufo
Ballad of Stompin' Tom - by David Scott, songs by Stompin' Tom Connors

2008
Against the Grain (World Premiere)  - by Carolyn Hay
Harvest  (World Premiere)  - by Ken Cameron
Courting Johanna  (World Premiere) - by Marcia Johnson, based on Hateship, Friendship, Courtship, Loveship, Marriage by Alice Munro
The Steven Truscott Project - by Beverley Cooper

2009
The Bootblack Orator  (World Premiere) by Ted Johns
The Mail Order Bride by Robert Clinton
Hockey Mom, Hockey Dad by Michael Melski
The Nuttalls  (World Premiere) by Michael Healey
Innocence Lost: A Play About Steven Truscott  (World Premiere) by Beverley Cooper

2010
A Killing Snow (World Premiere) by Paul Ciufo
Bordertown Cafe by Kelly Rebar
Pearl Gidley (World Premiere) by Gary Kirkham
The Book of Esther (World Premiere) by Leanna Brodie

2011
Hometown (World Premiere) by Jean Marc Dalpe, Mieko Ouchi, Mansel Robinson, Martha Ross, Peter Smith & Des Walsh
Vimy  by Vern Thiessen
Rope's End by Douglas Bowie
Early August (World Premiere) by Kate Lynch

2012
Dear Johnny Deere (World Premiere) by Ken Cameron, Based on the songs of Fred Eaglesmith
Having Hope at Home by David S. Craig
The Lonely Diner: Al Capone in Euphemia Township (World Premiere) by Beverley Cooper
The Devil We Know (World Premiere) by Cheryl Foggo and Clem Martini

2013
Dear Johnny Deere by Ken Cameron, Based on the songs of Fred Eaglesmith
Beyond the Farm Show (World Premiere) by The Collective
Yorkville - The Musical (World Premiere) Book and Lyrics by Carolyn Hay; Music by Tom Szczesniak
Garrison's Garage by Ted Johns
Prairie Nurse (World Premiere) by Marie Beath Badian
Falling: A Wake by Gary Kirkham

2014
Kitchen Radio (World Premiere) Book by Marion de Vries; Music & Lyrics by Marion de Vries and David Archibald
Billy Bishop Goes to War Written and composed by John MacLachlan Gray in collaboration with Eric Peterson
Stag and Doe (World Premiere) by Mark Crawford
St. Anne's Reel (World Premiere) by Gil Garratt

2015 
 Seeds Annabel Soutar
 Wilberforce Hotel (World Premiere) Sean Dixon 
 Fury (World Premiere) Book and Lyrics by Peter Smith; Music by Samuel Shouldice 
 Mary's Wedding Stephen Massicotte

2016 
 Our Beautiful Sons: Remembering Matthew Dinning (World Premiere) Christopher Morris 
 The Birds and the Bees (World Premiere) Mark Crawford 
 If Truth Be Told (World Premiere) Beverley Cooper 
 The Last Donnelly Standing (World Premiere) Paul Thompson and Gil Garratt

2017 
Mr. New Year's Eve: A night with Guy Lombardo (World Premiere) David Scott
The Berlin Blues Drew Hayden Taylor
The Pigeon King (World Premiere) The company (Rebecca Auerbach, Jason Chesworth, Gil Garratt, Gemma James Smith, George Meanwell, J.D. Nicholsen, Birgitte Solem, Severn Thompson)
Ipperwash (World Premiere) Falen Johnson and Jessica Carmichael

2018 
The Pigeon King (World Premiere) The company (Rebecca Auerbach, Jason Chesworth, Gil Garratt, Gemma James Smith, George Meanwell, J.D. Nicholsen, Birgitte Solem, Severn Thompson)
 The New Canadian Curling Club (World Premiere) Mark Crawford 
 Judith: Memories of a Lady Pig Farmer (World Premiere) Heather Davies, adapted from Judith, by Aritha van Herk
 1837: The Farmer's Revolt Rick Salutin and Theatre Passe Muraille
 Wing Night at the Boot (World Premiere) The Company

2019 
Jumbo (World Premiere) Sean Dixon
 Cakewalk Colleen Curran 
 The Team on the Hill Dan Needles
 In the Wake of Wettlaufer (World Premiere)
 Bed and Breakfast Mark Crawford

References

External links
 Blyth Festival website

Canadian theatre company production histories
Theatre in Ontario
Theatre festivals in Ontario